Rouen Saint-Sever was a large railway station serving the city of Rouen, Normandy, northern France. The station was situated along the quais of the River Seine to the east of city's centre.

The station opened on May 3, 1843, when the line from Paris-Saint-Lazare to Rouen opened to service. The station was destroyed in 1944 by the Allied bombardments and was not reopened to passenger traffic after repairs. A short-lived SNCF staff station called Rouen Préfecture occupied the site but closed in the 1990s.
On December 19, 2005, Rouen's municipal council unanimously agreed on the reopening of the station. The new station would be built on the site of the former station and be opened in 2020.

See also
Rouen Rue-Verte

References

External links
visite-de-rouen.com
Edgar Menguy Maire-Adjoint de Rouen

Buildings and structures in Rouen
Roune Saint Sever
Transport in Rouen
Railway stations in France opened in 1843
Railway stations closed in 1944